"Du får göra som du vill" is a song written by Patrik Isaksson and recorded by himself for his 1999 debut album När verkligheten tränger sig på. The song was awarded a Grammis award for "Song of the year 1999".

The single peaked at No. 11 in the Swedish singles chart, and was tested for Svensktoppen on 20 March 1999, but failed to enter the chart.

The song appeared in the 2004 film Fröken Sverige.

Erik Linder recorded the song for his 2009 album Inifrån.

Charts

References

External links
Information at Svensk mediedatabas
Information at Svensk mediedatabas

1999 singles
Swedish-language songs
Swedish pop songs
1999 songs
Sony Music singles